Mishchenko is a Ukrainian surname, and may refer to:

 Aleksandr Mishchenko (born 1997), German-Kyrgyz footballer
 Alexandr Mishchenko (born 1941), Russian mathematician
 Andriy Mishchenko (born 1991), Ukrainian footballer
 Anna Mishchenko (born 1983), Ukrainian middle distance runner
 Maksim Mishchenko (born 1977), Russian politician
 Michael I. Mishchenko (1959-2020), Ukrainian-American physicist
 Mikhail Mishchenko (born 1989), Russian footballer
 Oleh Mishchenko (born 1989), Ukrainian footballer
 Olga Mishchenko (born 1971), Ukrainian sprinter
 Olia Mishchenko (born 1980), Canadian artist
 Pavel Mishchenko (1853–1918), military officer and statesman in the Russian Empire
 Sergei Mishchenko (born 1961), Kazakh footballer
 Syla Mishchenko (1897–1941), Ukrainian military officer
 Vitaliy Mishchenko (born 1975), Ukrainian footballer

See also
 
 
 22686 Mishchenko, minor planet

Ukrainian-language surnames